Articles of Religion may refer to:

 Thirty-Nine Articles of Religion of the Church of England
 Articles of Religion (Methodist), of the American Methodist Church